Gnathopogon herzensteini is a species of ray-finned fish in the genus Gnathopogon endemic to China.

Although patronym not identified but clearly in honor of Russian ichthyologist Solomon Markovich Herzenstein (1854-1894), who named an Acanthogobio after Günther in 1892.

References

Gnathopogon
Cyprinid fish of Asia
Freshwater fish of China
Taxa named by Albert Günther
Fish described in 1896